State Route 160 (SR-160) is a state highway in the U.S. state of Utah providing a business loop around I-15 for the town of Beaver in the south-central portion of the state. The route is the main street for the town and spans . The highway was established 1961 as I-15 was constructed through the area, replacing US-91.

Route description
The highway begins at a diamond interchange on I-15 heading east and quickly turns north into Main Street. In the main part of town, it intersects with SR-21 to the west and SR-153 to the east. After leaving town to the north, the route turns back to the west and ends at another diamond interchange with I-15.

History
The current incarnation of State Route 160 was created in 1961 while I-15 was under construction in the area.

When I-15 was completed north of town in 1964, SR-1 was rerouted as it left Beaver to connect with the new interstate, following the same route as SR-161. As a result, SR-161 was withdrawn to avoid the two state routes overlapping. In 1969, the rest of SR-1 through the town was realigned with I-15. As a result, SR-160 was extended northward to follow the former route of SR-1 along main street north through town, then turning northwest to the interchange at I-15.

Major intersections

References

 160
160
State Route 160